Bahadur Chand Chhabra (born 3 April 1908), also known as B. Ch. Chhabra, was an Indian Sanskritist and epigraphist who served as Assistant and Joint Director General of the Archaeological Survey of India (ASI).

Early life and education 
Chhabra was born at Kohat near Peshawar in the then North-West Frontier Province (NWFP) of British India on 3 April 1908. Chhabra graduated from the Punjab University, Lahore and earned a doctorate. In the early 1930s, he joined the Archaeological Survey of India as an epigraphist under J. Ph. Vogel.

In the Archaeological Survey of India 
Chhabra succeeded Vogel as Chief Epigraphist in 1935 and served until 1953. In 1953, he became Assistant Director General and then, Joint Director General of the Archaeological Survey of India. Chhabra retired from ASI in 1966.

References 
  
 

1908 births
Year of death missing
People from Kohat District